The Rahu River is a river in the Buller District of New Zealand's South Island. It rises in two branches (the Left Branch and Right Branch) within Victoria Forest Park. State Highway 7 follows the upper course of the Rahu to the northwest of Springs Junction, crossing the Rahu Saddle into the valley of the Inangahua River.

See also
List of rivers of New Zealand

References

Rivers of the West Coast, New Zealand
Rivers of New Zealand